"This is Euphoria" is a single released  by Ruslana, featured on her 2013 studio album My Boo! (Together).  The arrangement and recording were done in Stockholm, Sweden.

Music video
The music video differs from all the previous clips of Ruslana as she attempts to raise awareness about the social problems of Ukraine, especially the lawlessness. 
The action is set in the near future of the country when the lives of every citizen is affected by the corrupt judicial system. Ruslana is thrown into jail on political reasons but she doesn't give up and fights until she brakes out thanks to her state of euphoria. 
The video was shot inside a former political jail located within the Kyiv Fortress.

Chart performance

Release history

References

2013 singles
Ruslana songs
Songs written by Ruslana
2012 songs
EMI Records singles
Songs written by Stefan Örn